Never Change: The Pain and Glory Album is the seventh solo studio album by American hip hop recording artist SPM. It was released in late 2001 under a joint venture between Dope House Records and Universal Records.

Track listing

Chart history

References

External links

2001 albums
South Park Mexican albums
Albums produced by Happy Perez